Here you can find all the Brazilian players that have appeared at least once for a team in Italy's Serie A. In Bold are the players still active in current season and their teams for this.

A

Adaílton – Parma, Verona, Bologna – 1997–98, 1999–2002, 2008–10
Adriano (Adriano Leite Ribeiro) – Inter, Fiorentina, Parma, Roma – 2001–09, 2010–11
Adriano (Adriano Pereira da Silva) – Palermo, Atalanta – 2004–05, 2006–08
Adryan – Cagliari – 2013–14
Alberto – Udinese, Siena – 1999–2008
Aldair – Roma – 1990–2003
Alemão – Napoli, Atalanta – 1988–94
Alex – Milan – 2014–16
Alex Sandro – Juventus – 2015–
Allan – Udinese, Napoli – 2012–20
Almir – Genoa – 1962–63
Yeso Amalfi – Torino – 1951–52
Amaral – Parma, Fiorentina – 1996–97, 2000–02
Amarildo (Amarildo Souza do Amaral) – Lazio, Cesena – 1989–91
Amarildo (Amarildo Tavares da Silveira) – Milan, Fiorentina, Roma – 1963–72
Amoroso – Udinese, Parma, Milan – 1996–2001, 2005–06
Anderson  (Anderson Luís de Abreu Oliveira)  – Fiorentina – 2013–14
Anderson  (Anderson Robert Cavalheiro)  – Como, Treviso – 2002–03, 2005–06
Andrade – Roma – 1988–89
Ângelo – Lecce, Parma, Siena – 2004–06, 2008–09, 2010–13
Anselmo – Genoa, Palermo – 2012–13
Antoninho – Fiorentina – 1960–61
Guilherme Arana – Atalanta – 2019–20
Vicente Arnoni – Milan – 1935–38
Arthur – Juventus – 2020–22
Artur – Roma – 2008–10
Marcos Assunção – Roma – 1999–2002
Athirson – Juventus – 2000–01
Carlos Augusto – Monza – 2022–
Danilo Avelar – Cagliari, Torino – 2012–17

B

Babú – Lecce, Catania – 2004–06, 2007–08
Júlio Baptista – Roma – 2008–11
Amilcar Barbuy – Lazio – 1931–32
Barreto – Udinese, Bari, Torino – 2005–07, 2009–15
Josias Basso – Reggina – 2008–09
Michel Bastos - Roma – 2013–14
Batista – Lazio, Avellino – 1983–86
Roberto José Battaglia – Catania, Atalanta – 1962–65
Rodrigo Becão – Udinese – 2019–
Alisson Becker – Roma – 2017–18
Demostene Bertini – Torino, Sampdoria – 1932–36
Beto – Napoli – 1996–97
Carlos Alberto Bianchezi – Atalanta – 1991–92
Fábio Bilica – Venezia, Brescia, Ancona – 1998–2000, 2001–04
Binho – Empoli – 1997–99
Renato Bondi – Messina – 2005–06
Branco – Brescia, Genoa – 1986–87, 1990–93
Bremer – Torino, Juventus – 2018–
Bruno Henrique – Palermo – 2016–17
Bruno Peres – Torino, Roma – 2014–18, 2019–21

C

Arthur Cabral – Fiorentina – 2021–
Caetano – Siena – 2007–08
Cafu – Roma, Milan – 1997–2008
Caio Rangel – Cagliari – 2014–15
Caio Ribeiro – Inter, Napoli – 1995–97
Antonio Roberto Camatta – Venezia – 1962–63
Gustavo Campanharo – Verona – 2014–15
Héctor Canalli – Torino – 1933–34
Cané – Napoli, Bari – 1962–63, 1965–70, 1972–75
Luan Capanni – Lazio – 2018–19
Careca – Napoli – 1987–93
Carlão – Torino – 2016–17
Roberto Carlos – Inter – 1995–96
Roger Carvalho – Genoa, Bologna – 2011–13
Walter Casagrande – Ascoli, Torino – 1987–90, 1991–93
Leandro Castán – Roma, Torino, Cagliari – 2012–18
José Castelli – Lazio – 1931–34
Catê – Sampdoria – 1998–99
Toninho Cerezo – Roma, Sampdoria – 1983–92
César (César Aparecido Rodrigues) – Lazio, Inter, Livorno, Bologna – 2001–09
César (César Vinicio Cervo de Luca) – Chievo, Catania – 2003–05, 2006–07, 2008–09
China – Sampdoria, Roma, Vicenza, Mantova – 1962–68
Chinesinho – Modena, Catania, Juventus, Vicenza – 1962–72
Cicinho – Roma – 2007–12
Claiton – Bologna, Chievo, Crotone – 2000–01, 2013–14, 2016-17
Sérgio Clerici – Lecco, Bologna, Atalanta, Verona, Fiorentina, Napoli, Lazio – 1960–62, 1966–78
Coelho – Bologna – 2008–09
Leonardo Colella – Juventus – 1955–56
Philippe Coutinho – Inter – 2010–13
Emílson Cribari – Empoli, Udinese, Lazio, Siena, Napoli – 2002–11
André Cruz – Napoli, Milan, Torino – 1994–2000
Felipe Curcio – Brescia – 2019–20
Davide Curti – Genoa – 1947–48

D

Da Costa – Sampdoria, Bologna – 2010–11, 2012–14, 2015–18, 2019–21
da Silva (Victor da Silva) – Chievo – 2012–13
Dalbert – Inter, Fiorentina, Cagliari – 2017–20, 2021–
Dani Alves – Juventus – 2016–17
Danilo (Danilo Larangeira) – Udinese, Bologna – 2011–21
Danilo (Danilo Luiz da Silva) – Juventus – 2019–
Danilo Sacramento – Genoa – 2007–08
Rodrigo Defendi – Udinese – 2005–06
Armando del Debbio – Lazio – 1931–35
Emanuele del Vecchio – Verona, Napoli, Padova, Milan – 1957–63
Marcos de Paula – Chievo – 2002–03, 2009–11
Carlos de Souza – Spal – 1962–64
André Dias – Lazio – 2009–14
Dida – Milan – 2000–01, 2002–10
Dido – Spal – 1955–57
Diego – Juventus – 2009–10
Digão – Milan – 2007–08
Marcus Diniz – Livorno – 2009–10
Mario di Pietro – Genoa – 1955–56
Dirceu – Verona, Napoli, Ascoli, Como, Avellino – 1982–87
 Dodô (Domilson Cordeiro dos Santos) – Fiorentina – 2022–
Dodô (José Rodolfo Pires Ribeiro) – Roma, Inter, Sampdoria – 2012–17
Doni – Roma – 2005–11
Guilherme do Prado – Perugia – 2003–04
Doriva – Sampdoria – 1998–99
Douglas Costa – Juventus – 2017–21
Douglas Santos – Udinese – 2013–14
Léo Duarte – Milan – 2019–21
Dunga – Pisa, Fiorentina, Pescara – 1987–93

E

Edenílson – Genoa, Udinese – 2014–17
Ederson (Ederson Honorato Campos) – Lazio – 2012–15
Éderson (Éderson José dos Santos Lourenço da Silva) – Salernitana, Atalanta – 2021–
Edimar – Chievo – 2014–15
Edinho (Edimo Ferreira Campos) – Lecce – 2008–09
Edinho (Edino Nazareth Filho) – Udinese – 1982–87
Edmar – Pescara – 1988–89
Edmundo – Fiorentina, Napoli – 1997–99, 2000–01
Edu – Torino – 1988–89
Eduardo Henrique – Crotone – 2020–21
Eloi – Genoa – 1983–84
Rodrigo Ely – Milan – 2015–16
Emerson  (Emerson Ferreira da Rosa)  – Roma, Juventus, Milan – 2000–06, 2007–09
Emerson  (Emerson Pereira da Silva) – Perugia – 1998–99
Emerson  (Emerson Ramos Borges) – Livorno – 2013–14
Alan Empereur – Verona – 2019–21
Eneas – Bologna – 1980–81
Evair – Atalanta – 1988–91
Lucas Evangelista – Udinese – 2014–15, 2016–17
Everton Luiz – SPAL – 2017–19
Ewandro – Udinese – 2016–17

F

Fabiano (Fabiano Lima Rodrigues) – Perugia, Genoa – 2003–04, 2007–08
Fabiano (Fabiano Medina da Silva) – Lecce – 2008–09, 2010–11
Fábio Júnior – Roma – 1998–2000
Falcão – Roma – 1980–85
Orlando Fantoni – Lazio – 1947–48
Diego Farias – Sassuolo, Cagliari, Empoli, Lecce, Spezia – 2013–15, 2016–22
Faustinho – Palermo – 1962–63
Felipe – Udinese, Fiorentina, Cesena, Siena, Parma, Inter, SPAL – 2002–20
Felipe Anderson – Lazio – 2013–18, 2021–
Lucas Felippe – Verona – 2019–20
Fernandinho – Verona – 2014–15
Fernando (Fernando Giudicelli) – Torino – 1931–33
Fernando (Fernando Lucas Martins) – Sampdoria – 2015–16
Fernando (José Ferdinando Puglia) – Palermo, Bari – 1961–64
Adriano Ferreira Pinto – Atalanta – 2006–10, 2011–12
Filipe – Roma – 2008–09
Daniel Fuzato – Roma – 2019–21

G
Gabriel (Gabriel Barbosa Almeida) – Inter – 2016–17
Gabriel (Gabriel Vasconcelos Ferreira) – Milan, Napoli, Cagliari, Lecce – 2013–14, 2015–17, 2019–20
Gabriel Silva – Novara, Udinese, Carpi, Genoa – 2011–17
Gaúcho Toffoli – Lecce – 1993–94
Goliardo Gelardi – Napoli – 1933–34
Geovani – Bologna – 1989–90
Germano – Milan, Genoa – 1962–63
Gérson (Gerson Candido de Paula) – Bari, Lecce – 1989–91, 1993–96
Gerson (Gerson Santos da Silva) – Roma, Fiorentina – 2016–19
Gilberto (Gilberto da Silva Melo) – Inter – 1998–99
Gilberto (Gilberto Moraes Junior) – Fiorentina, Verona – 2015–16
Gleison Santos – Genoa, Reggina – 2007–09
Guilherme (Costa Marques) – Benevento – 2017–18
Guilherme (dos Santos Torres) – Udinese – 2014–16
Gustavo (Gustavo Franchin Schiavolin) – Lecce – 2010–11
Gustavo (Gustavo Lazzaretti de Araújo) – Udinese, Treviso – 2004–06

H
Henrique (Henrique Adriano Buss) – Napoli – 2013–15
Henrique (Henrique Matheus de Souza) – Sassuolo – 2021–
Hernanes – Lazio, Inter, Juventus – 2010–17
Hernani – Parma, Genoa – 2019–22
Higo – Chievo – 2003–04

I
Roger Ibañez – Atalanta, Roma – 2018–
Ibson – Bologna – 2013–14
Igor – SPAL, Fiorentina – 2019–

J

Jadson – Udinese – 2013–14
Jair – Inter, Roma – 1962–72
Jandrei – Genoa – 2018–19
Mário Jardel – Ancona – 2003–04
Jeda – Vicenza, Cagliari, Lecce, Novara – 2000–01, 2007–12
João Paulo – Bari – 1989–92
Joelson – Reggina – 2007–08
Jonathan – Inter, Parma – 2011–15
Jonathas – Brescia, Pescara, Torino – 2010–11, 2012–13
Jorginho (Jorginho Paulista)– Udinese – 1999–2000
Juan – Roma – 2007–12
Juan Jesus – Inter, Roma, Napoli – 2011–
Juárez – Lecce, Como, Siena, Bologna, Udinese – 1999–2006
Juary – Avellino, Inter, Ascoli, Cremonese – 1980–85
Julinho – Fiorentina – 1955–58
Júlio César (Júlio César da Silva) – Juventus – 1990–94
Júlio César (Júlio César Santos Correa) – Milan – 2000–01
Júlio César (Júlio César Soares de Espíndola) – Inter – 2005–12
Júlio Sérgio – Roma, Lecce – 2009–12
Júnior (Leovegildo Lins da Gama Júnior) – Torino, Pescara – 1984–89
Júnior (Jenílson Ângelo de Souza) – Parma, Siena – 2000–04

K

Kaio Jorge – Juventus – 2021–
Kaká – Milan – 2003–09, 2013–14
Keirrison – Fiorentina – 2009–10
Kerlon – Chievo – 2008–09

L
Bruno Lança – Reggina – 2005–06
Leandro – Fiorentina – 2000–02
Lucas Leiva – Lazio – 2017–22
Leonardo – Milan – 1997–2001, 2002–03
Francisco Lima – Lecce, Bologna, Roma – 1999–2004
Lucas Souza – Parma – 2014–15
Luciano – Bologna, Chievo Verona, Inter – 1998–2000, 2001–07, 2008–13
Lúcio – Inter, Juventus – 2009–13
Luís Sílvio Danuello – Pistoiese – 1980–81
Luiz Adriano – Milan – 2015–17
Luvanor – Catania – 1983–84
Lyanco – Torino, Bologna – 2017–21

M

Maicon – Inter, Roma – 2006–12, 2013–16
Maicosuel – Udinese – 2012–14
Mancini – Roma, Inter, Milan – 2003–11
Marcão – Torino – 1994–95
Marco Aurélio – Vicenza – 1998–99, 2000–01
 Marcos Antônio – Lazio – 2022–
Marcos Paulo – Udinese – 2001–02
Marlon – Sassuolo, Monza – 2018–21, 2022–
Rafael Marques – Verona – 2013–15
Marquinho – Roma, Verona, Udinese – 2011–14, 2015–16
Marquinhos – Roma – 2012–13
Raphael Martinho – Catania, Cesena, Verona, Carpi – 2010-12, 2013–14, 2015-16
Ryder Matos – Fiorentina, Carpi, Udinese, Verona – 2013–14, 2015–18, 2020–21
Felipe Mattioni – Milan – 2008–09
Matuzalém – Napoli, Piacenza, Brescia, Lazio, Genoa, Verona – 2000–04, 2008–14, 2015–16
Maurício – Lazio – 2014–16, 2017–18
Maxwell – Inter – 2006–09
Mazinho – Lecce, Fiorentina – 1990–92
Felipe Melo – Fiorentina, Juventus, Inter – 2008–11, 2015–17
Fernando Menegazzo – Siena – 2003–05
Junior Messias – Crotone, Milan – 2020–
Mikael – Salernitana – 2021–22
Milton – Como – 1988–89
Armando Miranda  – Juventus, Catania – 1962–64
Miranda  (João Miranda de Souza Filho)  – Inter – 2015–19
Mozart – Reggina, Livorno – 2000–01, 2002–05, 2009–10
Müller – Torino, Perugia – 1988–89, 1990–91, 1996–97
Américo Murolo – Vicenza – 1955–56

N
Naldo – Bologna, Udinese – 2012–14
Nelsinho – Mantova – 1961–62
Nenê  (Ânderson Miguel da Silva)  – Cagliari, Verona – 2009–15
Nené  (Claudio Olinto de Carvalho)  – Juventus, Cagliari – 1963–76
Neto – Fiorentina, Juventus – 2011–17
Neuton – Udinese – 2011–12
Nícolas – Verona, Udinese – 2013–14, 2017–18, 2020–21
Niginho – Lazio – 1930–35
Ninão – Lazio – 1930–35

O
Ricardo Oliveira – Milan – 2006–07
Orlando – Udinese – 1981–82

P

Packer – Siena – 2005–06, 2008–09
Paco Soares – Sampdoria – 1997–98
Lucas Paquetá – Milan – 2018–20
Lucas Piazon – Chievo – 2018–19
Alexandre Pato – Milan – 2007–13
Paulinho – Livorno – 2004–07, 2013–14
Paulo Sérgio – Roma – 1997–99
Pedrinho – Catania – 1983–84
Pedro – Fiorentina – 2019–20
Andreas Pereira – Lazio – 2020–21
Matheus Pereira – Empoli, Juventus – 2016–17, 2018–19
Inácio Piá – Atalanta, Catania, Napoli – 2001–03, 2004–05, 2007–10
Guillermo Piantoni – Torino, Palermo – 1929–31, 1932–33
Pinga – Torino, Treviso – 1999–2000, 2001–02, 2005–06
César Prates – Livorno, Chievo – 2005–07

R

Rafael (Rafael Bittencourt de Andrade) – Verona, Cagliari, Spezia – 2013–18, 2019–21
Rafael (Rafael Cabral Barbosa) – Napoli, Sampdoria – 2013–15, 2016–17, 2018–19
Rafael (Rafael Pereira da Silva) – Messina – 2004–06
Rafinha  (Márcio Rafael Ferreira de Souza)  – Genoa – 2010–11
Rafinha  (Rafael Alcântara do Nascimento)  – Inter – 2017–18
Gaetano Ragusa – Napoli – 1933–34
Reginaldo – Treviso, Fiorentina, Parma, Siena – 2005–08, 2009–10, 2011–12
Reinaldo – Verona – 1996–97
Renan – Sampdoria – 2012–14
Renato Portalupi – Roma – 1988–89
Thiago Ribeiro – Cagliari – 2011–13
Rivaldo – Milan – 2002–03
Pedro Rizzetti – Lazio – 1931–34
Robinho – Milan – 2010–14
Rogerio – Sassuolo – 2017–
Ronaldinho – Milan – 2008–11
Ronaldo (Ronaldo Luiz Nazario da Lima) – Inter, Milan – 1997–2000, 2001–02, 2006–08
Ronaldo (Ronaldo Pompeu da Silva) – Empoli – 2015–16
Roque Júnior – Milan, Siena – 2000–04
Ruan – Sassuolo – 2021–
Rubinho – Genoa, Palermo, Livorno, Juventus – 2007–10, 2012–14, 2016-17

S

Duilio Salatin – Lazio – 1933–34
Samir – Verona, Udinese – 2015–22
Samuel – Perugia – 2001–02
Sandro – Benevento, Genoa, Udinese – 2017–19
Dino Sani – Milan – 1961–64
Juvenal Santillo – Napoli – 1933–34
Márcio Santos – Fiorentina – 1994–95
Rafael Santos – Bologna – 2009–10
Schumacher – Udinese – 2006–07
Léo Sena – Spezia – 2020–21
Enrico Serafini – Lazio – 1931–35
Serginho – Milan – 1999–2008
Bruno Siciliano – Vicenza, Venezia, Juventus, Bari – 1960–64
Sidny – Livorno – 2007–08
Silas – Cesena, Sampdoria – 1990–92
Thiago Silva – Milan – 2009–12
Fábio Simplício – Parma, Palermo, Roma – 2004–12
Guilherme Siqueira – Udinese – 2006–08, 2009–10
Sócrates – Fiorentina – 1984–85
Wilson Sorio – Spal – 1957–59
Gabriel Strefezza – SPAL, Lecce – 2019–20, 2022–

T

Rodrigo Taddei – Siena, Roma – 2003–14
Cláudio Taffarel – Parma, Reggiana – 1990–94, 2001–02
Júnior Tavares – Sampdoria – 2018–19
André Tedesco – Lazio – 1931–32
Alex Telles – Inter – 2015–16
Tita – Pescara – 1988–89
Eugênio Rômulo Togni – Pescara – 2012–13
Humberto Tozzi – Lazio – 1956–60
Tuta – Venezia – 1998–99

U
Bruno Uvini – Napoli – 2013–14

V
Vágner – Roma – 1997–98
Vampeta – Inter – 2000–01
Ronaldo Vanin – Torino – 2002–03
Vinício – Napoli, Bologna, Vicenza, Inter – 1955–68
Felipe Vizeu – Udinese – 2018–19
Vitor Hugo – Fiorentina – 2017–19

W
Walace – Udinese – 2019–
Wallace (Wallace Fortuna dos Santos) – Lazio – 2016–19
Wallace (Wallace Oliveira dos Santos)  – Inter, Carpi – 2013–14, 2015–16
Warley – Udinese – 1999–2000, 2001–03
Wellington – Catania – 2011–12
Wilker – Treviso – 2005–06
Willians – Udinese – 2012–13
Wilson – Genoa – 2007–08

Z

Benedicto Zacconi – Torino, Lazio – 1933–39
Antônio Carlos Zago – Roma – 1997–2002
Zé Eduardo (Bischofe de Almeida ) – Genoa, Siena – 2011–13
Zé Eduardo (de Araújo) – Parma, Cesena – 2010–12, 2014–15
Zé Elias – Inter, Bologna – 1997–2000
Zé Maria – Parma, Perugia, Inter – 1996–99, 2000–06
Zico – Udinese – 1983–85

See also
List of foreign Serie A players
Foreign Serie A Footballer of the Year
List of Brazilian footballers in Serie B
Oriundo

Notes

Italy

Association football player non-biographical articles